Montivipera xanthina, known as the rock viper, coastal viper, Ottoman viper, and by other common names, is a viper species found in northeastern Greece and Turkey, as well as certain islands in the Aegean Sea. Like all other vipers, it is venomous. No subspecies are currently recognized.

Description
Dorsally, it is grey or white with a black zig-zag stripe. Melanistic individuals exist. It has keeled dorsal scales.

It usually grows to a total length (body + tail) of 70–95 cm (27.6-37.4 in), but reaches a maximum total length of 130 cm (51.2 in) on certain Greek islands in the Aegean Sea.

Behavior
Very aggressive, this snake will strike without provoking, and most bites inject venom.

Habitat
Montivipera xanthina can be found living in humid areas. It favors rocky and "well-vegetated" areas for its habitat.

Prey
The diet of M. xanthina is thought to consist of rodents and other small mammals and native birds. It may prey on lizards, as well.

Common names
Rock viper, coastal viper, Ottoman viper, Turkish viper, Near East viper, mountain viper.

Geographic range
Extreme northeastern Greece, the Greek islands of Simi, Skiathos, Kos, Kalimnos, Samothraki, Leros, Lipsos, Patmos, Samos, Chios and Lesbos, European Turkey, the western half of Anatolia (inland eastward to Kayseri), and islands (e.g. Chalki) of the Turkish mainland shelf.

The type locality given is "Xanthus" [southwestern Turkey (Kınık)], and "Asia Minor." Listed as "Xanthos" by Schwarz (1936). Nilson and Andrén (1986) restricted the species to "Xanthos" [= Xanthus] (Kınık) province Mugla, S. W. Turkish Anatolia" through lectotype designation.

Conservation status
This species is classified as least concern according to the IUCN Red List of Threatened Species. It is listed as such due to its wide distribution, presumed large population, and because it is unlikely to be declining fast enough to qualify for listing in a more threatened category.
It is, however, listed as strictly protected (Appendix II) under the Berne Convention.

Taxonomy
According to Nilson, Andrén and Flärdh (1990), M. bornmuelleri, M. bulgardaghica, M. wagneri and M. xanthina are all closely related and together form the Montivipera xanthina group or complex.

Venom
There's not much information and data about the venom composition, activity, and lethality of this specific species. However, similar to other species within the genus Montivipera and the related Vipera genus, it has mainly cytotoxic, haemotoxic, and other minor components to its venom. Although it injects only small amounts of venom in a bite, the venom of this species is highly potent and has been known to have caused fatalities in adult humans. This can be more common in young children or older individuals that get a case of severe envenomation (especially if fangs inject venom directly into a vein, for instance).

According to Batzri-Izraeli et al, 1982, the  value via intravenous injection (IV) was 0.25 mg/kg. Similarly, Iranian herpetologist Mahmoud Latifi found the lethality of the crude venom from the species Montivipera xanthina to be 0.42 mg/kg in a 1984 study, and 0.35 mg/kg in a 1985 study, which Latifi conducted for the Department of the Environment in Iran (was translated to English in 1991). In his 1984 study, Latifi found the average venom yield to be 10 mg (dry weight of milked venom). This average was attained from the milking of 4,446 specimens of M. xanthina. The maximum yield was 18 mg (dry weight of milked venom) in the same study.

Further reading

Arnold, EN, Burton JA. 1978. A Field Guide to the Reptiles and Amphibians of Britain and Europe. London: Collins. 272 pp. . (Vipera xanthina, p. 223 + Plate 40 + Map 126.)
Gray JE. 1849. Catalogue of the Specimens of Snakes in the Collection of the British Museum. London: Trustees of the British Museum. (Edward Newman, printer.) xv + 125 pp. (Daboia Xanthina, p. 24.)
Nilson G, Andrén C. 1986. The mountain vipers of the Middle East: The Vipera xanthina complex. Bonner Zoologische Monographien 20: 1-90.
Nilson G, Andrén C, and Flärdh B. 1990. Vipera albizona a new mountain viper from central Turkey, with comments on the isolating effects of the Anatolian "diagonal." Amphibia-Reptilia 11: 285-294.
Schwarz E. 1936. Untersuchungen über Systematik und Verbreitung der europäischen und mediterranen Ottern. Behringwerke-Mitteilungen 7: 159-262.

External links

 
 Montivipera xanthina at Amphibians and Reptiles of Europe. Accessed 18 January 2010.

xanthina
Reptiles of Europe
Reptiles of Turkey
Reptiles described in 1849
Taxa named by John Edward Gray